Holgersson is a Swedish surname. Notable people with the surname include:

Bengt Holgersson, the first Governor of Skåne County after a merger of Malmöhus County and Kristianstad County in 1997
Glenn Holgersson (born 1979), Swedish footballer playing for Örebro SK
Hannah Holgersson (born 1976), opera singer from Höör, Skåne County, Sweden

Fictional characters
 Nils Holgersson, the main character of The Wonderful Adventures of Nils
  Sven Holgersson, fictional character from Voltron franchise

Swedish-language surnames